Thurman John "T. J." Rodgers (born March 15, 1948) is an American billionaire scientist and entrepreneur. He is the founder of Cypress Semiconductor and holds patents ranging from semiconductors to energy to winemaking. Rodgers is known for his public relations acumen, brash personality, and strong advocacy of laissez-faire capitalism. He stepped down as Cypress CEO in April 2016 and Director in August 2016 after serving for 34 years.

Early life
Rodgers was born on March 15, 1948, in Oshkosh, Wisconsin. He goes back to nearby Green Bay, Wisconsin several times a year to attend Green Bay Packers football games. His father was a car salesman and worked for General Motors and his mother was a school teacher, with a master's degree in radio electronics. He was a Sloan scholar at Dartmouth College and played on the Dartmouth Big Green football team. In 1970 he received his bachelor's degree, graduating as salutatorian with majors in chemistry and physics. He received his master's degree (1973) and Ph.D. (1975) in electrical engineering from Stanford University. While pursuing his Ph.D. degree, Rodgers invented the VMOS process technology, which he later licensed to American Microsystems, Inc. He founded Cypress Semiconductor in 1982. He was awarded an honorary doctorate from the Universidad Francisco Marroquín in Guatemala City.

Career
After finishing a doctorate at Stanford, he turned down a job offer from Intel, saying that CEO Andrew S. Grove was unlikely to give him the freedom to pursue his own projects. Instead Rodgers accepted a job at American Microsystems, Inc. (AMI), where he continued development of VMOS, but this project was a failure.

Cypress Semiconductor
Rodgers founded Cypress Semiconductor in 1982 and served as founding CEO. Cypress is a semiconductor design and manufacturing company, producing PSoCs, microcontroller, IoT, wireless and USB, PMICs, memory and sensor chips. As CEO, Rodgers was responsible for more than 30 acquisitions, including SunPower and the IoT portfolio of Broadcom Corporation. Cypress also benefited from its business with Apple Inc., as its PSoC was behind the iPod click wheel. He stepped down as CEO in April 2016. In 2015, Cypress had more than 6,000 employees and revenues of US$1.6 billion. The company had about 7,000 issued patents and about 1,200 additional patent applications on record.

Proxy fight
In 2017 Rodgers conducted a successful proxy fight against Cypress. He raised concerns pertaining to director compensation, state-sponsored foreign competition as well as inherent conflicts of interest. After filing a lawsuit against the company in April 2017, Rodgers sought to remove executive chairman Ray Bingham and Éric Benhamou from the Cypress board and nominated Dan McCranie and Camillo Martino as directors. Rodgers argued that Bingham's role as a co-founder of Canyon Bridge, a private equity fund supported by the Government of China, constituted a clear conflict of interest as acquisition targets for both companies overlapped. Bingham was forced to resign from the Cypress board in early June 2017 and both of Rodgers' nominees won the subsequent 2017 shareholder election against Benhamou.

SunPower
Rodgers early recognized the value of high efficiency solar cells produced by SunPower. As SunPower faced financial problems in 2001, Rodgers tried to convince the Cypress board to buy the solar cell producer. Rodgers and SunPower CEO Richard Swanson had met in the 70s at Stanford University. But as the Cypress board of directors was not interested in saving the struggling company Rodgers wrote a check himself for $750,000. About a year later Rodgers had convinced the board to invest $9 million in SunPower and a few months later Cypress bought a majority stake in SunPower. In 2005 SunPower went public and reached a market capitalization of $10.4 billion in 2007. From May 2002 to May 2011, Rodgers served as chairman of SunPower.

Enphase Energy
In January 2017, Rodgers invested US$5 million in Enphase Energy, a renewable energy firm specialized in energy management and the production of solar micro-inverters, which transform solar energy to alternating current for the electrical grid. In addition to his investment, Rodgers joined Enphase's board of directors.

Board memberships
 Bloom Energy, a fuel cell producer
 Enovix, producer of silicon lithium-ion batteries
 Enphase Energy, energy technology company
 FarmX, precision agriculture company
 FTC Solar, a renewable energy company
 Bespoken Spirits Inc., a beverage technology company

Rodgers also served as director of the Semiconductor Industry Association.

Trustee of Dartmouth College
After successfully launching a petition drive to get his name on the ballot, Rodgers won the alumni trustee election of Dartmouth College in 2004, becoming the first successful petition candidate since 1980. He won with a comfortable margin. As trustee, Rodgers’ major concerns were removing the College's speech code, increasing the budget for teacher salaries and strengthening Dartmouth's focus on undergraduate education. Following the campaign of Rodgers, three additional independent trustees were elected in 2005 and 2007. Rodgers was reelected as trustee in 2009.

Clos de la Tech
Rodgers began winemaking in 1996 on a one-acre vineyard surrounding his house in Woodside. Later he bought two additional vineyards and, along with his wife Valeta, Rodgers established the winery Clos de la Tech in the Santa Cruz Mountains of Silicon Valley. Clos de la Tech uses old French winemaking techniques of Domaine de la Romanée-Conti to make five Pinot Noir wines. This includes stomping the grapes with feet and siphoning the wine by hand. Also, no mechanized pumps are used. Clos de la Tech combines these old techniques with high tech monitoring and measures to optimize the conditions for the crops and to handle grapes and wine as gently as possible. Clos de la Tech's Pinot Noirs have been rated up to 96 points by Wine Enthusiast Magazine. As winemaker, Rodgers invented a patented wine press and computer monitored fermenters. He also designed and built the first wireless wine fermentation network, comprising 152 fermenters, and donated the system worth US$3.5 million to the UC Davis winery.

Comments on diversity
In 1996, Rodgers made headlines when Sister Doris Gormley, the Director of Corporate Social Responsibility for The Sisters of St. Francis of Philadelphia, sent him a form letter encouraging him to hire women and minorities on the Cypress board. He replied with a long letter defending his hiring practices and philosophy. In 1999, he wrote an editorial in the San Jose Mercury News denouncing Jesse Jackson's attack on Cypress Semiconductor on what Jackson claimed was discriminatory hiring practices.

Personal life
Rodgers is an avid jogger and wine enthusiast. He is a supporter of several charities, including Second Harvest of Silicon Valley, and served as a trustee on the Dartmouth College Board of Trustees from 2004 to 2012. He is the husband of Valeta Massey.

Awards and recognition

1986:
 Entrepreneur of the Year by City of Santa Clara, California
1988:
 ENCORE (Entrepreneurial Company of the Year) Award from the Stanford University Business School
1996:
 "CEO of the year" – Financial World
1997
 Outstanding Individual Entrepreneurship Award from the U.S. Association for Small Business and Entrepreneurship
2000:
 Award from the Healing Institute for his support of the Carver Scholars Program
2001:
 Cited as one of the "100 People Who Changed Our World." by Upside
 Silicon Valley Capitalism Award for "exemplifying the virtues of capitalism and defending capitalism with ethical principles in the media."
 Angel Award by the International Angel Investors organization for his venture-capital activities supporting the semiconductor industry
 Entrepreneur of the Year Award from the Smith Center for Private Enterprise Studies at California State University, Hayward
2002:
 "Top 100 Chief Executives" by Chief Executive
2005 :
 Inducted into the Silicon Valley Engineering Council Hall of Fame.
2006:
 Honored with a Fellow Award from the International Engineering Consortium.
2009:
 Spirit of Ireland Award

Patents

1975US3878552 – Bipolar Integrated Circuit and MethodUS3924265 – Low capacitance V groove MOS NOR gate and method of manufacture

1976US3975221 – Low capacitance V groove MOS NOR gate and method of manufacture

1980US4222063 – VMOS Floating gate memory with breakdown voltage loweringregionUS4222062 – VMOS Floating gate memory device

1981CA1115426 – U-groove mos device

1988US5835401 – DRAM with hidden refreshUS4764248 – Rapid thermal nitridized oxide locos process

1999US5977638 – Edge metal for interconnect layers

2000US6131140 – Integrated cache memory with system control logic and adaptation of RAM bus to a cache pinout

2001US6185126 – Self-initializing RAM-based programmable device

2004US6835616 – Method of forming a floating metal structure in an integratedcircuitUS6730545 – Method of performing back-end manufacturing of an integrated circuit deviceUS2004076712 – Fermentation tank wine press 

2005US6903002 – Low-k dielectric layer with air gapsUS6847218 – Probe card with an adapter layer for testing integrated circuits

2006US7045387 – Method of performing back-end manufacturing of an integrated circuit

2007US7227804 – Current source architecture for memory device standby current reduction

2008US2008315847 – Programmable floating gate referenceUS2008102160 – Wine-making press

2009US7507944 – Non-planar packaging of image sensor

2017US9624094 – Hydrogen barriers in a copper interconnect process

Bibliography
 

See also
 Milton Friedman – Nobel Prize-winning economist, debated Rodgers and Mackey
 John Mackey – founder of Whole Foods Market, debated Rodgers and Friedman

References

External links
  – A debate between John Mackey, Milton Friedman, and T.J. Rodgers
 Text of Rodger's letter to Sister Gormley.
 
 Profile from Dartmouth College upon his election to the Dartmouth College Board of Trustees
 T.J. Rodgers – Libertarian from the Advocates for Self-Government website
 
 
 Mr. Rodgers Goes to Dartmouth A cautionary tale about a businessman who ventured back into the Ivory Tower. Interview in the Wall Street Journal'' 2008-02-15

Living people
Dartmouth College alumni
American inventors
American libertarians
American chief executives of manufacturing companies
1948 births
American technology chief executives
People from Oshkosh, Wisconsin
Businesspeople from Wisconsin
People from Woodside, California
Dartmouth Big Green football players